Five County Stadium is a baseball stadium located in Zebulon, North Carolina, a suburb of Raleigh.  It is the home of the Carolina Mudcats of the Carolina League. The ballpark, which was opened in 1991 and extensively renovated in 1999, has a capacity of 6,500.

The stadium's name comes from its location – the stadium property is located in Wake County, within  of Franklin, Nash, Johnston, and Wilson counties.

US 264 passes by the stadium at a generally northwest-to-southeast angle (behind left and center fields), while NC 39 skirts the east side of the property (right field). Parking lots surround the field on the other sides, and a large grass field, often used as a campground, lies behind home plate.

History
When Columbus Mudcats owner Steve Bryant moved the club to North Carolina in 1991, he wanted a new facility that was deemed to be outside the territories of other minor league clubs in the state (including the Carolina League's Greensboro Hornets, which he also owned) while also being easily accessible by the public. A site was chosen in Zebulon, which was as close to Raleigh as the Mudcats could get without infringing on the territorial rights of the Durham Bulls. To construct the ballpark quickly, the builders opted for metal seating rather than the traditional concrete. The 1999 renovation replaced most of the metal with concrete.

The Double-A Mudcats moved to Pensacola in 2011, and the Carolina League's Kinston Indians moved to Zebulon and continued as the Mudcats at Class A-Advanced until being reorganized to Low-A for the 2021 season.

Images

References

External links

Five County Stadium Views Ball Parks of the Minor Leagues
Ballpark Reviews

Minor league baseball venues
Sports in Raleigh-Durham
Baseball venues in North Carolina
1991 establishments in North Carolina
Sports venues completed in 1991
Sports venues in Wake County, North Carolina
Carolina League ballparks